In historiography, a chronicon is a type of chronicle or annals. Examples are:
Chronicon (Eusebius)
Chronicon (Jerome)
Chronicon Abbatiae de Evesham
Chronicon Burgense
Chronicon Ambrosianum
Chronicon Compostellanum
Chronicon Gothanum
Chronicon Helveticum
Chronicon Holtzatiae
Chronicon Iriense
Chronicon Lethrense
Chronicon Lusitanum
Chronicon Paschale
Chronicon Pictum
Chronicon Roskildense
Chronicon Salernitanum
Chronicon Scotorum
Chronicon complutense
Chronicon terrae Prussiae

Chronicles